Michelangelo Palloni (1637—1712) was an Italian painter of the Baroque period, who worked in the Polish–Lithuanian Commonwealth from 1674 onward.

Palloni was born at Campi Bisenzio, Florence.  In 1688, he became a court painter of the Polish king Jan III Sobieski. He was a pupil of  Baldassare Franceschini (Il Volterrano)

Works
Frescoes and paintings in:
Pažaislis Monastery in Kaunas, Lithuania
Krasiński Palace, Warsaw, Poland
 The Open and Closed Galleries of Wilanów Palace (1688), Warsaw, Poland
Chapel of St. Casimir in Vilnius Cathedral (1692), Lithuania
Sapieha Palace in Vilnius, Lithuania
Churches in Łowicz (1695) and in Węgrów (1706–08), Poland

References 

1637 births
1712 deaths
People from Campi Bisenzio
Italian Baroque painters
17th-century Italian painters
Italian male painters
18th-century Italian painters
Court painters of Polish kings
Italian expatriates in Poland
Painters from Florence
Place of death unknown
18th-century Italian male artists